Jacob Wisner House, also known as the Rapp House, is a historic home located in Charlestown Township, Chester County, Pennsylvania. It was built in two sections.  The older section dates to 1761, and is a 2 1/1-story, three bay wide, stone structure.  A two bay wide extension was added in the 1840s.  The addition was originally built to house a saddle and harnass-maker's shop and later housed the Sidley Post Office.

It was added to the National Register of Historic Places in 1979.

References

Houses on the National Register of Historic Places in Pennsylvania
Houses completed in 1761
Houses in Chester County, Pennsylvania
National Register of Historic Places in Chester County, Pennsylvania